Abraham Stavsky (January 5, 1906 – June 22, 1948) was an activist member of Betar, the youth movement of a Revisionist Zionist group founded by Vladimir Jabotinsky.

On June 18, 1933, Stavsky was arrested by the British Mandate police as a suspect in the  June 16, 1933, murder of Chaim Arlosoroff. He was convicted on June 8, 1934, and sentenced to death. 
There was quite a bit of controversy regarding the accuracy of the charge and righteousness of the conviction among the Jewish public; an outspoken supporter of Stavsky was the Chief Rabbi of Palestine, Rav Kook. His conviction was overturned in 1934, by the highest British Court of Appeals in Palestine.

He went on to work with the Irgun in smuggling thousands of Jews out of Europe during the Holocaust. Stavsky died on the beached Altalena in the midst of exploding onboard munitions during heavy machine gun exchange with Haganah forces. Ironically, Stavsky died 50 yards from the very spot where Chaim Arlosoroff was murdered 15 years and 5 days earlier.

See also
Assassination of Haim Arlosoroff

References

1906 births
1948 deaths
1933 crimes in Asia
Aliyah Bet activists
People from Brest, Belarus
People from Brestsky Uyezd
Belarusian Jews
Jews from the Russian Empire
Betar members